The Beni Ounif massacre took place on a desert highway near the Moroccan border at Beni Ounif in Bechar Province on 15 August 1999. The perpetrators flagged down cars at a false roadblock and beheaded 23 men, women and children and shot dead 6 more people as they tried to run away. They also kidnapped two 15-year old girls and stole the belongings of their victims. President Abdelaziz Bouteflika suggested that the terrorists found shelter in Morocco, but a Moroccan government spokeman denied that Morocco had anything to do with any of the suspected members of the GIA.

References 

Algerian massacres of the 1990s
1999 in Algeria
Massacres in 1999
Algerian Civil War